= Zarghuna Walizada =

Afghan businesswoman

- Occupation: Businesswoman
- Known for: Founder of Tac Taz

Zarghona Walizada is an Afghan businesswoman, who owns and is the founder of Afghanistan's largest transport company, Tac Taz, which she founded in 1990. Her company employs several hundreds of people and has its headquarters in Kabul and several branch offices throughout the country. Zarghuna Walizada set up Tac Taz alone, in spite of threats from her competition, and despite attacks on the trucks of her company by insurgents and criminals. These attacks make cargo transportation one of the most dangerous businesses in Afghanistan.

Zarghuna Walizada's TAC TAZ International was established in 1990. With an annual turnover of US$35 million, she employs 400 people. Into construction and freighting, she sought joint ventures, marketing and management support.
